2001 is a pinball machine designed by Ed Krynski and produced by Gottlieb in 1971. The game has no official relation to the 1968 film 2001: A Space Odyssey,  although there are similarities.

Background
Krynski, the designer, stated that the idea of the target bank found on 2001 was to try to make as many drop targets as possible to do the work on one solenoid. Cost savings was its inspiration. The game appealed to players because the rules were simple.

References

External links
Internet Pinball Database entry for 2001

Gottlieb pinball machines
1971 pinball machines